Alcozauca de Guerrero  is a city and seat of the municipality of Alcozauca de Guerrero, in the state of Guerrero, south-western Mexico.

References

External links
 Photos of Alcozauca de Guerrero

Populated places in Guerrero